Aspera is a data transport and streaming technology company that provides high speed data transfer services. Aspera belongs to the hybrid cloud business unit of IBM.

History

Aspera was founded in 2004 by Michelle Munson and Serban Simu. Aspera developed FASP, a high-speed data transfer protocol, and software products based on FASP. IBM acquired Aspera in January 2014. 

Aspera won a 2013 Primetime Engineering Emmy Award for Outstanding Achievement in Engineering Development and a 2014 Technology and Engineering Emmy Award for Secure Accelerated File Movement over IP including the Internet. The company received a Hollywood Professional Association (HPA) Engineering Excellence Award for its Telestream Vantage with Lightspeed Live Capture product in 2018.

Patents
Aspera has been granted the following patents:

 2005: Bulk data transfer technology.

 2007: Methods and systems for aggregate bandwidth control.

 2009: Practical models for high speed file delivery services, supporting guaranteed delivery times and differentiated service levels.

 2010: Methods and systems for input and output driven rate adaptation.

 2012: Multicast bulk transfer systems.

 2015: Bulk data transfer and measuring the roundtrip time of requests and transmissions.

See also

 List of mergers and acquisitions by IBM

References

External links

IBM acquisitions
IBM subsidiaries